Eyewitness Dinosaur Hunter is an educational video game in the Eyewitness Virtual Reality series, developed by DK Multimedia and released for Windows in 1996.

Gameplay 

The player explores the museum, using a point-and-click method. The museum is in the shape of the Eyewitness logo. The outer corridor contains a timeline showing the evolutionary branches of certain dinosaurs, the east room contains maps and images of what the world looked like during the period in which dinosaurs existed, and the west room is a multi-level excavation site where the player can dig for fossils. Upon completion of a skeleton, the dinosaur will "come to life" and roam the museum. The rest of the museum contains various exhibits, which players can either explore themself or experience through four virtual tours: Introduction, how dinosaurs lived, how dinosaurs evolved, and extraordinary dinosaurs.

Reception 

The game was considered advanced for its time, described as virtual reality, although today the term is restricted to much more advanced programs. Chilldhood Education journal described it as having a "feeling of walking through an actual museum" despite the simple point-and-click system used  while likewise The Culture of Design said the game's developers went to "extraordinary lengths" to make the museum believable.

The New York Times described the game as having a "clear, clean interface and design". Edmonton Journal praised how it combined "old-fashioned reading and model building".

Other Eyewitness Virtual Reality titles 

 Eyewitness Virtual Reality Earth Quest
 Eyewitness Virtual Reality: Cats
 Eyewitness Virtual Reality Bird

References 

Dinosaurs in video games
Science educational video games
1996 video games
Video games developed in the United Kingdom
Windows games
Windows-only games